The Chubb Classic is a golf tournament on the PGA Tour Champions, held annually in February in Naples, Florida. It has been played at a variety of courses, and Chubb Corporation is the main sponsor.

It debuted  in 1988 as the Aetna Challenge,. The purse in 2016 was $1.6 million with a winner's share of $240,000.

For 2021, the event moves to Tiburón Golf Club, but on the Black Course, which will be the first time it has been used in professional play. Tiburón's Gold Course is used for the QBE Challenge and CME Group Tour Championship, but this will be the first use of the secondary course.

Host courses

Winners

Multiple winners
Seven players have won this tournament more than once through 2022.

5 wins
Bernhard Langer: 2011, 2013, 2016, 2022, 2023
2 wins
Fred Couples: 2010, 2017
Loren Roberts: 2006, 2009
Hale Irwin: 1997, 2002
Gil Morgan: 1998, 2001
Mike Hill: 1993, 1994 (consecutive)
Lee Trevino: 1990, 1991 (consecutive)

References

External links

Coverage on the PGA Tour Champions official site

PGA Tour Champions events
Golf in Florida
Sports in Naples, Florida
Recurring sporting events established in 1988
1988 establishments in Florida